The Spitfire is a 1914 American comedy film directed by Edwin S. Porter and Frederick A. Thomson, written by Edward Henry Peple, and starring Carlyle Blackwell, Violet Mersereau, Lionel Adams, Robert Cummings, William R. Dunn and Redfield Clarke. It was released on June 20, 1914, by Paramount Pictures.

Plot

Cast 
Carlyle Blackwell as Bruce Morson
Violet Mersereau as Valda Girard
Lionel Adams as James Ormond
Robert Cummings as Tracy
William R. Dunn as Beasley
Redfield Clarke as Marcus Girard 
June Dale as Cousin Polly
Lois Arnold as Aunt Mary

References

External links 
 

1914 films
1910s English-language films
Silent American comedy films
1914 comedy films
Paramount Pictures films
American black-and-white films
American silent feature films
Films directed by Frederick A. Thomson
1910s American films